Chris Eylander (born March 14, 1984) is a former American soccer player.

Career

Youth and College
Eylander had an outstanding youth career. He won the 1998, 1999 and 2000 Washington State youth soccer championship with his club team, Federal Way United Storm '83. He attended Auburn Riverside High School where he was the 2002 Washington State Player of the Year. He then attended the University of Washington, playing on the men's soccer team from 2002 to 2005.  During his college career, Eylander would spend each summer with a Premier Development League team.  In 2002 and 2003, he played with the Seattle Sounders Select, in 2004 with the Spokane Shadow and in 2005 with the Yakima Reds.

Professional
In 2006, the Seattle Sounders of the USL First Division selected Eylander with their pick in the USL First Division College Draft. He played 23 games his first season with the Sounders and twenty-seven in 2007 as Seattle took the USL-1 championship.  After much speculation, he eventually made the move 'up' to MLS expansion team Seattle Sounders FC, signing with them on January 6, 2009.  He made his first start on April 18, 2009 after starter Kasey Keller was forced to sit out a game for a red card. He also played in a 4-1 U.S. Open Cup play-in victory over Real Salt Lake on April 28, 2009. Eylander was waived by the Sounders on March 22, 2010.

References

External links
 Sounders player profile

1984 births
Living people
American soccer players
Seattle Sounders Select players
Spokane Shadow players
Yakima Reds players
Seattle Sounders (1994–2008) players
Seattle Sounders FC players
Major League Soccer players
Soccer players from Washington (state)
USL First Division players
USL League Two players
University of Washington alumni
Washington Huskies men's soccer players
Association football goalkeepers
People from Sumner, Washington